Aphilenia is a genus of leaf beetles in the subfamily Eumolpinae. It is distributed in Central and East Asia as well as southern Russia. Members of the genus are adapted to dry climates, and feed on bushes of the genus Calligonum. In 2012, the genus was moved from the tribe Bromiini to the tribe Nodinini (now known as Typophorini).

Species
 Subgenus Aphilenia Weise in Reitter, 1889 (type species: Aphilenia interrupta Weise in Reitter, 1889)
 Aphilenia astakhovi Moseyko, 2012 – Russia: Astrakhan Oblast
 Aphilenia gobica Lopatin, 1970 (formerly a subspecies of A. interrupta) – Mongolia, China: Inner Mongolia
 Aphilenia interrupta Weise in Reitter, 1889 – Turkmenistan, Uzbekistan, Tajikistan, Kazakhstan, Turkey
 Aphilenia ornata Reitter, 1889 – Kazakhstan, Uzbekistan, Turkmenistan
 Aphilenia parvula Weise in Hauser, 1894 – Turkmenistan, Uzbekistan
 Subgenus Pseudaphilenia Lopatin, 1976 (type species: Aphilenia hauseri Weise in Hauser, 1894)
 Aphilenia lopatini Moseyko, 2013 – Kazakhstan
 Aphilenia mujunkumica Moseyko, 2013 – Kazakhstan
 Aphilenia unicolor Reitter, 1889 (formerly a variation of A. interrupta; synonym: A. hauseri Weise in Hauser, 1894) – Turkmenistan, Uzbekistan

References

Eumolpinae
Chrysomelidae genera
Beetles of Asia
Beetles of Europe
Taxa named by Julius Weise